Vellikizhamai Viratham is a 1974 Indian Tamil-language devotional film, directed by R. Thyagarajan in his debut and produced by Sandow M. M. A. Chinnappa Thevar under Dhandayudhapani Films. The film stars Sivakumar, Jayachitra and Jayasudha, along with Nagesh, Sundarrajan, Srikanth and Sasikumar as supporting actors. It was released on 12 April 1974. The film was remade in Telugu as Nomu (1974) and in Hindi as Shubh Din (1974).

Plot

Cast 
 Sivakumar as Nagarajan / Rajan
 Nagesh as Ramu
 Sundarrajan as Kanthasamy
 Srikanth as Ashok
 Sasikumar as Suresh
 Sandow M. M. A. Chinnappa Thevar as Nattamai
 Jayachitra as Parvathi
 Jayasudha as Jaya

Production 
Vellikizhamai Viratham is the directorial debut of R. Thyagarajan. Kamal Haasan worked under K.Thangappan as his dance assistant. The film's story was written by Sandow Chinnappa Thevar inspired from the films The Shadow of the Cat and Cult of the Cobra who initially created a plot revolving around a child and snake since Thyagarajan wanted romance, a new plot was formed. Thyagarajan revealed sound overlapping system technology was used in the film.

Soundtrack 
Music was composed by Shankar–Ganesh and lyrics were  written by A. Maruthakasi.

Release 
Vellikizhamai Viratham was released on 12 April 1974. The film was a major success, and propelled Jayachitra to stardom.

References

External links 
 

1970s Tamil-language films
1974 directorial debut films
1974 films
Films about snakes
Films directed by R. Thyagarajan (director)
Films scored by Shankar–Ganesh
Hindu devotional films
Tamil films remade in other languages